Stephen I of Meaux (died 1022) was the seventh Count of Meaux, in the Champagne region of modern-day France, after his father Herbert III, Count of Meaux.

He died without issue. The title of  Count of Meaux passed to Odo II of Blois, his cousin.

Herbertien dynasty
Counts of Meaux
1022 deaths
Year of birth unknown